Two ships of the Imperial Russian Navy have been named Tri Sviatitelia (Three Holy Hierarchs).

  - First rate ship of the line scuttled in 1854 during the Siege of Sevastopol
  - Predreadnought battleship assigned to the Black Sea Fleet during World War I

Russian Navy ship names